Vol. 2 is a compilation album by Wooden Shjips.

References

2010 compilation albums